Pramod Viswanath is a Professor of Electrical and Computer Engineering at the University of Illinois at Urbana–Champaign. He was named Fellow of the Institute of Electrical and Electronics Engineers (IEEE) in 2013 for contributions to the theory and practice of wireless communications.

Viswanath received his bachelor's degree from National Institute of Technology Karnataka and Ph.D. degree in electrical engineering and computer science from the UC Berkeley College of Engineering in 2000.

Ever since joining the University of Illinois at Urbana–Champaign, he has held important positions at various levels. He has a number of patents and research accomplishments to his name. He has also authored a number of books and research papers.

References

External links

20th-century births
Living people
Indian computer scientists
Indian electrical engineers
UC Berkeley College of Engineering alumni
University of Illinois Urbana-Champaign faculty
Fellow Members of the IEEE
Year of birth missing (living people)
Place of birth missing (living people)